Naucoridae is a small family of insects commonly known as the creeping water bugs and saucer bugs. Naucoridae are found around the world, but the greatest diversity is in tropical regions. They inhabit a wide range of freshwater habitats, ranging from still waters like ponds, to flowing rivers and even torrential streams. There are about 400 species in 46 genera in 8 subfamilies.

They were formerly united in a superfamily Naucoroidea with the Aphelocheiridae and Potamocoridae, but these are now in their own superfamily (Aphelocheiroidea) and the Naucoroidea are monotypic.

Genera
These 46 genera belong to the family Naucoridae:

 Afronaucoris Sites, 2022
 Ambrysus Stål, 1862
 Aneurocoris Montandon, 1897
 Aptinocoris Montandon, 1897
 Asthenocoris Usinger, 1937
 Australambrysus Reynoso & Sites, 2021
 Australonaucoris Sites, 2022
 Carvalhoiella De Carlo, 1963
 Cataractocoris Usinger, 1941
 Cheirochela Hope, 1840
 Coptocatus Montandon, 1909
 Cryphocricos Signoret, 1850
 Ctenipocoris Montandon, 1897
 Decarloa La Rivers, 1969
 Diaphorocoris Montandon, 1897
 Gestroiella Montandon, 1897
 Halmaheria Zettel, 2007
 Heleocoris Stål, 1876
 Heleolaccocoris Sites, 2022
 Hygropetrocoris Sites, 2015
 Idiocerus Montandon, 1897
 Ilyocoris Stål, 1861
 Indonaucoris Sites, 2022
 Interocoris La Rivers, 1974
 Laccocoris Stål, 1856
 Limnocoris Stål, 1858
 Macrocoris Signoret, 1861
 Maculambrysus Reynoso & Sites, 2021
 Melloiella De Carlo, 1935
 Namtokocoris Sites, 2007
 Nanonaucoris Zettel, 2001
 Naucoris Geoffroy, 1762
 Neomacrocoris Montandon, 1913
 Nesocricos La Rivers, 1971
 Pelocoris Stål, 1876
 Philippinocoris D. Polhemus & J. Polhemus, 1987
 Picrops La Rivers, 1952
 Placomerus La Rivers, 1956
 Procryphocricos J. Polhemus, 1991
 Sagocoris Montandon, 1911
 Stalocoris La Rivers, 1969
 Tanycricos La Rivers, 1971
 Temnocoris Montandon, 1897
 Tsingala Sites, 2022
 Warisia La Rivers, 1971

References

 
Nepomorpha
Heteroptera families